MilkShake is a Thai pop girl group that formed under the HALO Society label in affiliation with GMM Grammy agency in 2015 in Bangkok, Thailand.

Members

Singles

GMM Grammy artists
Musical groups from Bangkok
Thai girl groups